The Southeast Conference, formerly known as the Southeast 7, is an athletic conference made up of six high schools in the southeast corner of Iowa. All of the current schools compete at the 3A level, the second-largest in Iowa.

History
This conference was once known as the Little Six Conference. In 1969 the high schools Bettendorf, Muscatine, and Assumption left the league for conferences that made more geographical sense.

Ottumwa, Burlington and Keokuk High Schools then invited Quincy, IL (Catholic Boys) to join them in a four-team league that maintained the Little Six Conference name. That affiliation fell apart after a couple of years.

Ottumwa High School and Keokuk High School, as the only remaining members, formed the Southeast 7 to meet their needs for a conference. The new league was made up of Keokuk High School, Fort Madison High School, Mt. Pleasant High School, Fairfield High School, Oskaloosa High School, Ottumwa High School, and Washington High School. Oskaloosa left the conference after the 1983 baseball season to join the South Central Conference.  Oskaloosa returned after the 1995-1996 School year after being asked to leave the South Central  Conference due to enrollment numbers and after being denied membership into the Little Hawkeye Conference due to travel distance.  After Ottumwa went to the CIML and Oskaloosa was accepted into the Little Hawkeye Conference in 1998, the conference changed its official name to the Southeast Conference.

Starting with the 2019-2020 school year, Burlington joined the Southeast Conference, joining from the Mississippi Athletic Conference, of which it had been a charter member when formed (as the Mississippi Eight) in 1978.

The conference's schools have faced shrinking enrollment. Located in the southeast corner of the state, the cities with schools in the conference were some of the first cities settled in Iowa, but have seen their populations decline in the recent decades.

Current members

References

Former members
Centerville, 1958-1972, Left For South Central Conference
Davis County, 1958-1972, Left For South Central Conference
Oskaloosa, 1969-1983 Left For South Central Conference, 1996-1998 Left for Little Hawkeye Conference
Ottumwa, 1983-1998, Left for CIML
Burlington, 1961-1969
Bettendorf, ????-1969
Muscatine, ????-1969
Davenport Assumption, 1963-1969
Quincy, IL Catholic Boys 1970-1971

External links
 Official Website

High school sports in Iowa